Miguel Ángel Torrén (born August 12, 1988) is an Argentine professional footballer who plays as a centre-back for Argentine Primera División side Argentinos Juniors.

Career

Club 
Torren played for Newell's Old Boys since 2005, but he had to wait until the Apertura 2006 tournament to become a first team regular, playing in 18 of the team's 19 games. He went on to make 25 appearances for the club, including one game in the Copa Libertadores 2006 tournament.

In 2008, he joined Cerro Porteño of Paraguay. Subsequently, in 2010, he joined defending Argentine Primera División champion Argentinos Juniors.

On February 11, 2019 he played 200 games defending the shirt of Argentinos Juniors, being the first to achieve it in the 21st century, placing 16th in the ranking of those who had the most appearances with said shirt.

On April 28, 2019 scored his first goal as a professional. It was in the 1-0 victory against San Lorenzo in the Argentine Super League Cup

Titles

External links 
 BDFA profile
 Argentine Primera statistics at Futbol XXI

1988 births
Living people
People from Constitución Department
Argentine footballers
Argentina youth international footballers
Argentina under-20 international footballers
Association football defenders
Newell's Old Boys footballers
Cerro Porteño players
Argentinos Juniors footballers
Argentine Primera División players
Primera Nacional players
Paraguayan Primera División players
Expatriate footballers in Paraguay
Argentine expatriate footballers
Sportspeople from Santa Fe Province